Caldimicrobium thiodismutans  is a Gram-negative, thermophilic, rod-shaped, autotrophic and motile bacterium from the genus of Caldimicrobium which has been isolated from a hot spring in Nakabusa in Japan.

References

External links 
Type strain of Caldimicrobium thiodismutans at BacDive –  the Bacterial Diversity Metadatabase
 

Thermodesulfobacteriota
Bacteria described in 2016
Thermophiles